Zelluloid (German for "Celluloid") is the fourth studio album released by the Neue Deutsche Härte band Unheilig.  It was released on February 16, 2004, in two versions, a standard 14-track edition and a limited 16-track edition. The standard edition is in a regular jewel case, with a black album color, while the limited edition is as a digipak, with a cream-white album cover.

Zelluloid is an autobiography of Der Graf, the frontman and founder of Unheilig. On the back of the case insert included with the album, Der Graf states (translated from German): "Zelluloid is a review of my past. Every song is a story from a moment in my life. Like an art film...how I viewed every moment."

In July 2009, Zelluloid was re-released with new artwork and a remastered audio track but the album cover stayed the same.

Track listing

References

2004 albums
Unheilig albums
German-language albums